Kabar, officially Kyrgyz National News Agency Kabar, is the official news agency of Kyrgyzstan and the oldest news agency in the country.

History and profile
The agency was launched in 1937 under the name of KyrTAG. It became a state-run news agency and was renamed as KyrgyzKabar in 1992. Three years later it was named the Kyrgyz National Agency for Telecommunications and Information Administration Kabar. In 2001, it was renamed as the Kyrgyz National News Agency Kabar.

Kabar is headquartered in Bishkek.  the director general of the agency was Kubanichbek Tabaldiyev. Kuban Abdymen was appointed director in February 2011, succeeding Jyrgalbek Turdukojoev. Kuban Abdymen was the director of the agence between 2000 and 2006.

The agency signed a cooperation agreement with Trend International News Agency of Azerbaijan on 8 November 2013. Kabar is a member of the Organization of Asia-Pacific News Agencies (OANA).

References

1937 establishments in the Soviet Union
Government agencies established in 1937
Mass media in Bishkek
News agencies based in Kyrgyzstan
Publicly funded broadcasters
State media